This is the list of communities in Quebec that have the legal status of northern village (village nordique, code=VN) as defined by the Ministry of Municipal Affairs, Regions and Land Occupancy and the Act respecting Northern villages and the Kativik Regional Government legislation.

A "northern village" is an Inuit community; these are all located north of the 55th parallel in the territory administered by the Kativik Regional Government. These have a separate legal status from Cree villages (code=VC), Naskapi villages (code=VK), or ordinary villages (code=VL).

Note that most (all but two) northern villages have a counterpart Inuit reserved land of the same name (code=TI, terre de catégorie 1 pour les Inuits or Terre de la catégorie I pour les Inuits or Terre réservée inuite).  These are separate territories that are located near the northern village of the same name, and are for the exclusive use of Inuit for various hunting, fishing, and other economic activities.  The Canada 2011 Census and the 2006 census before it show that all of these Inuit reserved lands have no resident population.

Northern villages and Inuit reserved lands

Other 
Some apparently outdated sources show the following as Inuit reserved lands:
 Kiggaluk, with geographic code 99875, adjacent to the Cree village of Chisasibi (this is below the 55th parallel and therefore outside the territory of the Kativik Regional Government)
 Killiniq, with geographic code 99896 (not to be confused with the abandoned town of Killiniq, Nunavut on Killiniq Island, about  further north)

Neither of these is currently listed in the Répertoire des municipalités of the Ministère des Affaires municipales, des Régions et de l'Occupation du territoire, nor have they appeared in the Canadian censuses at least as far back as the 2001 census.

See also 
 Municipal history of Quebec

External links 
 Nunivaat.org Census profile 2021
 MAMROT Répertoire des municipalités
 An Act respecting Northern villages and the Kativik Regional Government (also in French)

References 

Quebec
 
 
Village municipalities
North villages and Inuit